Christian Otto, Wild- and Rhinegrave of Salm-Dhaun (14 April 1680 – 24 April 1748) was Wild- and Rhinegrave of Salm-Dhaun from 1742 until his death.  He was the son of John Philip II and his wife Anna Catherine of Nassau-Ottweiler.

He was the uncle of his predecessor, John Philip III, who died at age 18.  Christian Otto himself also died unmarried and childless.  He was succeeded by John Frederick, the son of his younger brother Walrad.

Salm family
1680 births
1748 deaths
18th-century German people
Counts of Salm